Myekeleni is the seventeenth studio album by South African singer Brenda Fassie, released on December 5, 2002 in Johannesburg by CCP Records. In 2004 EMI Records re-issued this recording on a digital platform. Myekeleni is composed of mid-tempo Pop, Afropop, Mbaqanga and Kwaito songs. 

DJ CALL ME has sampled the album song "Mama I'm Sorry" in his House Music version of "Mama I'm Sorry", found on his 2006 EP.

The album was a hit in South Africa and around Africa, selling over a million copies.

Tracklist
Credits adapted from Allmusic.

Credit

Brenda Fassie - Composer, Primary Artist, Vocals
Sello "Chicco" Twala - Arranger, Composer, Producer
Adam Howard - Horn
Oscar Mdlongwa - Programming
Oskido - Additional Vocals (Track 9)
Mandoza - Additional Vocals (Track 1)
Spikiri - Additional Vocals (Track 9)
J. Mdwandi - Programming
Jimmy Mgwandi - Bass
Mark Morrison - Photography
Marvin Moses - Mastering, Mixing
Bruce Sebitlo - Keyboards, Mixing

References

2002 albums
Brenda Fassie albums